All of Me: The Debonair Mr. Hartman is a 1957 album by Jazz singer Johnny Hartman. It was released on the Bethlehem label. The album was reissued in 2000 with four additional tracks, alternate takes of songs from the original album.

Reception

Scott Yanow reviewed All of Me for Allmusic and wrote that the album's "emphasis is on ballads (always Hartman's strong point) with the highlights including 'Blue Skies,' 'Tenderly,' 'The Lamp Is Low' and 'I Concentrate on You.'"

Track listing 
 "Blue Skies" (Irving Berlin) - 2:57
 "I Could Make You Care" (Sammy Cahn, Saul Chaplin) - 3:36
 "Tenderly" (Walter Gross, Jack Lawrence) - 3:23
 "The Lamp Is Low" (Peter DeRose, Mitchell Parish, Maurice Ravel, Bert Shefter) - 2:44
 "While We're Young" (William Engvick, Morty Palitz, Alec Wilder) - 2:58
 "The Birth of the Blues" (Lew Brown, Buddy DeSylva, Ray Henderson) - 2:57
 "I'll Follow You" (Fred E. Ahlert, Roy Turk) - 3:34
 "I Concentrate on You" (Cole Porter) - 3:50
 "Stella by Starlight" (Ned Washington, Victor Young) - 3:47
 "I Get a Kick Out of You" (Cole Porter) - 3:09
 "The End of a Love Affair" (Edward Redding) - 3:21
 "All of Me" (Gerald Marks, Seymour Simons) - 2:19
Alternate takes released on 2000 CD reissue
"Blue Skies" - 3:27
 "I Get a Kick Out of You" - 3:25
 "Birth of the Blues" - 3:00
 "All of Me" - 2:26

Personnel 
From The Last Balladeer: The Johnny Hartman Story.
Johnny Hartman - vocals
Howard McGhee - trumpet
Ernie Royal - trumpet
Frank Rehak - trombone
Anthony Ortega - alto saxophone
Lucky Thompson - tenor saxophone
Jerome Richardson - tenor saxophone, flute
Danny Bank - baritone saxophone
Hank Jones - piano
Milt Hinton - double bass
Osie Johnson - drums
Ernie Wilkins - arranger, conductor (1,6,10,12-16)
Frank Hunter - arranger, conductor (2-5,7-9,11)
Frank Hunter string orchestra

References 

1957 albums
Bethlehem Records albums
Johnny Hartman albums